You and Me is a 1971 Soviet drama film directed by Larisa Shepitko.

Plot 
The film tells about two doctors who have not completed their work. One of them realized that he had done wrong and decided to change his life.

Cast 
 Leonid Dyachkov as Pyotr
 Yuri Vizbor as Sasha
 Alla Demidova as Katya
 Natalya Bondarchuk as Nadya (as N. Bondarchuk)
 Leonid Markov as Sergey (as L. Markov)
 Vladimir Nosik as Kolka (as V. Nosik)
 Oleg Yefremov as Oleg Pavlovich (as O. Yefremov)
 Viktor Shulgin 
 Natalya Shvets as Patsientka (as N. Shvets)
 Aleksandr Yanvaryov as Valka (as A. Yanyaryov)

References

External links 
 

1971 films
1970s Russian-language films
Soviet drama films
1971 drama films